Ximena Daiana Velazco Núñez (born 31 July 1995) is a Uruguayan professional footballer who plays as a midfielder for the Uruguay women's national team.

References 

1995 births
Living people
Uruguayan women's footballers
Women's association football midfielders
Club Nacional de Football players
Peñarol players
Sport Club Internacional players
Campeonato Brasileiro de Futebol Feminino Série A1 players
Uruguay women's international footballers
Uruguayan expatriate women's footballers
Uruguayan expatriate sportspeople in Brazil
Expatriate women's footballers in Brazil
Sport Club Internacional (women) players